Union Station is a 1950 crime drama film noir directed by Rudolph Maté and starring William Holden, Nancy Olson and Barry Fitzgerald.

Plot
At Chicago Union Station (though filmed at Los Angeles Union Station), Police Lieutenant William "Bill" Calhoun is approached by an apprehensive passenger named Joyce Willecombe who believes that two men aboard her train may be up to no good.

The two men deposit a suitcase in a storage locker. When Bill retrieves it, Joyce recognizes the clothing as belonging to Lorna Murchison, the blind daughter of wealthy Henry Murchison, Joyce's employer. When Mr. Murchison is brought in, he admits Lorna has been kidnapped and held for ransom, but does not want the police to get involved as they might endanger his daughter's life. Bill and his boss, Inspector Donnelly, persuade him to accept their help. The railway station where Calhoun works has been chosen as the location to pay off the ransom. Bill and Donnelly race against time to save Lorna and bring the kidnappers to justice.

When the kidnappers make contact with Murchison at the station, Joyce recognizes them. The police trail one of them, Gus Hadder, but he spots them and runs, only to die in an accident. The police prevent his death from being reported in the newspapers. Later, Joyce spots Joe Beacom, the leader of the gang, and sees a third kidnapper, Vince Marley. Beacom drives away (though Joyce memorizes the license plate number), but the police arrest Marley. When he refuses to talk, Donnelly tells Bill to kill him and make his death look accidental. When the policemen pretend to prepare to throw Marley in front of an arriving train, he breaks and tells them where Lorna is being held. However, Beacom and his girlfriend Marge Wrighter have already taken Lorna somewhere else by the time they break in.

When a patrolman spots Beacom's car, a gunfight breaks out. The policeman is killed, and Wrighter is fatally wounded in the crossfire. In the hospital, she tells Bill and Donnelly that Beacom intends to kill Lorna after he gets the ransom. She also reveals that Beacom used to work at the station.

Beacom, dressed as an employee, forces a parcel clerk at gunpoint to accept the suitcase with the ransom money and switch it with another one that looks just like it. The clerk tells the messenger who brought the ransom to take the second suitcase somewhere else. However, Joyce notices part of a coat sticking out of it. Bill tries to apprehend Beacom, but is shot in the shoulder. Beacom flees to the municipal tunnel underneath the station, where he left Lorna, with Bill in hot pursuit. Bill manages to shoot and kill Beacom and rescue Lorna. Afterward, Joyce (who has developed an attraction to Bill, and vice versa) notices Bill's wound.

Cast
 William Holden as Lt. William Calhoun
 Nancy Olson as Joyce Willecombe
 Barry Fitzgerald as Inspector Donnelly
 Lyle Bettger as Joe Beacom
 Jan Sterling as Marge Wrighter
 Allene Roberts as Lorna Murchison
 Herbert Heyes as Henry L. Murchison
 Don Dunning as Gus Hadder
 Fred Graff as Vince Marley
 James Seay as Detective Eddie Shattuck
 Parley Baer as Detective Gottschalk (as Parley E. Baer)
 Ralph Sanford as Detective Fay
 Richard Karlan as Detective George Stein
 Bigelow Sayre as Detective Ross
 Charles Dayton as Howard Kettner
 Jean Ruth as Pretty Girl
 John Crawford as Hackett (uncredited)
 George Lynn as Detective Moreno (uncredited)

Background
The film was based on Nightmare in Manhattan, an Edgar-winning novel by Thomas Walsh.  Sydney Boehm's script for the film version was nominated for an Edgar in the screenplay category.  Aside from changing the setting from New York City's Grand Central Station to Chicago's Union Station (though the Los Angeles Union Station was the actual filming location), and changing the kidnap victim from a little boy to  a blind, teen-aged girl, the script was quite faithful to its source material.

William Holden and Nancy Olson also appeared in Sunset Boulevard the same year.

Filming locations
Filming locations include: Union Station, Downtown Los Angeles, California.  Also, it looks like it was filmed on Chicago's South Side El from 1892 to Indiana station, where the train is uncoupled to go on the Stockyards Branch, which ran until 1957.  Normally, the branch ran as a shuttle. It terminated at Exchange station, which was the terminal after 1956.

Reception
The staff at Variety gave actor William Holden a good review, writing, "William Holden, while youthful in appearance to head up the railway policing department of a metropolitan terminal, is in good form."

Channel 4's film review notes, "Despite the barely believable plot, the film has a real edge. Made in 1950, it obviously can't push to the extremes of Dirty Harry but it shares the same mean spirit. Maté capitalizes on the story's setting by using innocent passengers and the station's dramatic spaces to heighten the feverish atmosphere."

Critic Jerry Renshaw lauded the film and wrote, "On the surface, Union Station is a fairly routine action film for 1950, with its high level of suspense, strong-arm police procedural tactics, and caper-film trappings. However, a definite noir outlook is belied by the fact that the police play as rough as the bad guys, blurring the lines of good and evil. Audiences are used to seeing Barry Fitzgerald as a kindly Irish priest in most roles; during the scene on the empty platform, though, Fitzgerald's Inspector Donnelly tells the cops in his most charming Father O'Flaherty voice, 'Make it look accidental.' That's one of the more chilling moments of noir, more suited to James Ellroy than Fifties Hollywood. Director Maté also helmed the classic D.O.A. in 1950."

References

External links
 
 
 
 

1950 films
1950 crime drama films
American crime drama films
American crime thriller films
American black-and-white films
Film noir
Films based on American novels
Rail transport films
Films set in Chicago
Paramount Pictures films
Films directed by Rudolph Maté
1950s crime thriller films
1950s English-language films
1950s American films